Terara is a suburb of Nowra in the City of Shoalhaven in New South Wales, Australia. It lies on the southern bank of the Shoalhaven about 3 km to the north-east of Nowra.

References

City of Shoalhaven